Maxime Bousselaire (19 August 1901 – 3 November 1997) was a French athlete. He competed in the men's shot put at the 1924 Summer Olympics.

References

External links
 

1901 births
1997 deaths
Athletes (track and field) at the 1924 Summer Olympics
French male shot putters
Olympic athletes of France
Place of birth missing